Yee Fu is one of the 19 constituencies in the Tai Po District.

The constituency returns one district councillor to the Tai Po District Council, with an election every four years. The seat was currently held by Yam Kai-bong of the Neo Democrats.

Yee Fu constituency is loosely based on Yee Nga Court and most part of Fu Shin Estate in Tai Po with estimated population of 14,644.

Councillors represented

Election results

2010s

2000s

1990s

References

Tai Po
Constituencies of Hong Kong
Constituencies of Tai Po District Council
1994 establishments in Hong Kong
Constituencies established in 1994